Achor is a valley in the vicinity of Jericho. Achor may also refer to:

Harold Achor (1907–1967), Justice of the Indiana Supreme Court
Shawn Achor (born 1978), American author and speaker
Achor, Ohio, unincorporated community in Columbiana County, Ohio